The Council for Peace at Home, alternatively called the Peace Council, claimed to be an executive body that led a coup attempt in Turkey starting on 15 July 2016 and ended on 16 July 2016. The name was made public in a statement read on air during the 15 July 2016 temporary takeover by soldiers of the headquarters of Turkish state broadcaster TRT. The group was supposedly formed within the Turkish Armed Forces clandestinely. It was declared to be the governing council of Turkey during the coup attempt. The existence of council was firstly announced by Tijen Karaş, a news anchor at the state-owned TRT news channel, allegedly at gunpoint.

The name "Peace at Home Council" is derived from 'Peace at Home, Peace in the World', which is a famous quote of Atatürk. Although it was self-declared as the successor to the incumbent 65th government of Turkey, the citizens taking to the streets failed the coup attempt meant that the Council took neither de facto nor de jure power in the country.

Events
The formation of the council and its dismissal of the Justice and Development Party (AKP) government was announced live on the state broadcaster TRT after soldiers took over the channel's broadcasting headquarters. The stated aims of the council were "to reinstate constitutional order, human rights and freedoms, the rule of law and general security that was damaged". No set information regarding members and structure of the council were given and TRT suspended broadcasting shortly after the delivery of the statement announcing the council's creation.

Statement and subsequent analysis
The statement that was read on air at TRT headquarters, said (in Turkish) that

Analysis
A BBC article by Ezgi Başaran said that "the statement of the junta, that was ... read on ... government TV as the coup got under way, bore a strong resemblance to Mustafa Kemal Atatürk's famous address to the Turkish Youth. [...] On the other hand, given that these references are too obvious, they may have been intentionally included to insinuate a Kemalist junta rather than a Gülenist one".

Staged coup allegations
In the aftermath of the coup attempt, commentators on social media alleged that the creation of the council had been staged to invoke greater support for the governing Justice and Development Party (AKP), with some sceptics citing the lack of any solid information on the council's actual composition as evidence that the entire ordeal had been faked by the government."

Composition
No official statement regarding the composition of the council was given. According to the state-run Anadolu News Agency, subsequent investigations and allegations pointed to the leader being former Colonel Muharrem Köse, who had been dismissed earlier in 2016 from his role as legal advisor to the Chief of Staff due to his apparent links with Fethullah Gülen.

Aftermath
The Peace Council was eventually unable to take power after pro-coup forces were defeated and the incumbent AKP government retained control. Mass arrests were later made, targeting over two thousand soldiers including senior officers and generals. Speculation emerged that former Turkish Air Force Commander Akın Öztürk had been in charge of the coup attempt.

References

Military of Turkey
2016 in Turkish politics
2016 establishments in Turkey
2016 Turkish coup d'état attempt
2016 disestablishments in Turkey
Organizations based in Ankara
Organizations designated as terrorist by Turkey